Hattusili III (Hittite: "from Hattusa") was king of the Hittite empire (New Kingdom) c. 1275–1245 BC (middle chronology) or 1267–1237 BC (short chronology timeline).

Early life and family

Much of what is known about the childhood of Hattusili III is gathered from a biographical account, written on a stone tablet during his reign, referred to as the Apology. Hattusili III was born the youngest of four children to the Hittite king Mursili II and queen Gassulawiya. According to Hattusili III himself, he was an ill and sickly child who was initially expected not to survive to adulthood. Hattusili III credited the goddess Ishtar with saving his life during this period, and would remain an ardent patron of Ishtar indefinitely. Due to his place as the youngest son, Hattusili III did not become king after the death of his father. Instead his older brother Muwattalli II ascended the throne.

Before becoming king, Hattusili III married Puduhepa, a priestess of Ishtar, who later became an important Hittite queen in her own right. With Puduhepa, Hattusili III had three children, including his successor Tudhaliya IV.

Rise to kingship and reign as king
When his brother Muwattalli II became king, Hattusili III was appointed to govern over the northern lands of the Hittite empire. While this initially caused minor controversy among the locals and the ousted governor, Hattusili III was quick to quash dissidence with military force and turned his eyes towards conquering new territories surrounding the northern Hittite lands. When the King made the decision to move the capital from Hattusa to Tarhuntassa, Hattusili III was left to quash the rebellions that arose due to this decision. Subsequently, Hattusili III was made King of the northern territories by his brother Muwattalli II.

Upon the death of Muwattalli II, Hattusili III's nephew Urhi-Teshub became king. There was controversy with this appointment, because Urhi-Teshub was the son of Muwattalli's concubine, not his wife. Despite his origins as a "second-rank son", Hattusili III initially supported Urhi-Teshub's kingship as it was the wish of Muwatalli II that Urhi-Teshub should rule. Urhi-Teshub ruled under the name Mursili III. Shortly after his accession to the throne, Mursili III had the capital moved from Tarhuntassa back to its original home of Hattussa. This effectively reduced much of Hattusili's power in the region and nullified his role as king of the northern territories. Hattusili III was also stripped of all of his territories aside from Hapkis and Nerik. This strained the relationship greatly, and upon having Nerik stripped of him as well, Hattusili III sought to usurp the throne.

After deposing Mursili III as king, Hattusili III exiled him to Syria. Hattusili III appointed Muwattalli II's other son Kurunta, whom he himself had raised, to govern Tarhuntassa in a similar capacity that Hattusili III himself had once held.

As king, Hattussili III sought to keep a correspondence with many different kingships in the surrounding areas. After his ascension to the throne, Hattusili III began a correspondence with Egyptian Pharaoh Ramesses II that culminated in the first ever recorded peace treaty, the Eternal Treaty (also known as the Treaty of Kadesh). This correspondence took place roughly fifteen years after the Battle of Kadesh.

Hattusili's reign as king is notable for the large collection of letters and written accounts unearthed from this period. Over two-hundred letters were unearthed at the site of the royal palace in Hattusa. These primary sources, including The Apology, the Talagalawa letter, and the Arzawa letters, are considered among the very few primary sources available from the Hittite empire of the time.

See also

 History of the Hittites

References

External links
 Reign of Hattusili III
 The Eternal Treaty from the Hittite perspective by Trevor Bryce, BMSAES 6 (2006), pp. 1–11
The Apology of Hattusilis III Hittite text and English translation at UT Austin Linguistics Research Center

Hittite kings
13th-century BC rulers